Occupational asthma is new onset asthma or the recurrence of previously quiescent asthma directly caused by exposure to an agent at workplace. It is an occupational lung disease and a type of work-related asthma. Agents that can induce occupational asthma can be grouped into sensitizers and irritants.

Sensitizer-induced occupational asthma is an immunologic form of asthma which occurs due to inhalation of specific substances (i.e., high-molecular-weight proteins from plants and animal origins, or low-molecular-weight agents that include chemicals, metals and wood dusts) and occurs after a latency period of several weeks to years.

Irritant-induced (occupational) asthma is a non-immunologic form of asthma that results from a single or multiple high dose exposure to irritant products. It is usually develops early after exposure; however can also develop insidiously over a few months after a massive exposure to a complex mixture of alkaline dust and combustion products, as shown in the World Trade Center disaster. Unlike those with sensitizer-induced occupational asthma, subjects with irritant-induced occupational asthma do not develop work-related asthma symptoms after re-exposure to low concentrations of the irritant that initiated the symptoms. Reactive airways dysfunction syndrome (RADS) is a severe form of irritant induced asthma where respiratory symptoms usually develop in the minutes or hours after a single accidental inhalation of a high concentration of irritant gas, aerosol, vapor, or smoke.

Another type of work-related asthma is work-exacerbated asthma (WEA) which is asthma worsened by workplace conditions but not caused by it. WEA is present in about a fifth of patients with asthma and a wide variety of conditions at work, including irritant chemicals, dusts, second-hand smoke, common allergens that may be present at work, as well as other "exposures" such as emotional stress, worksite temperature, and physical exertion can exacerbate asthma symptoms in these patients. Both occupational asthma and work-exacerbated asthma can be present in an individual.

A number of diseases have symptoms that mimic occupational asthma, such as asthma due to nonoccupational causes, chronic obstructive pulmonary disease (COPD), irritable larynx syndrome, hyperventilation syndrome, hypersensitivity pneumonitis, and bronchiolitis obliterans.

Signs and symptoms 
Like other types of asthma, it is characterized by airway inflammation, reversible airways obstruction, and bronchospasm, but it is caused by something in the workplace environment. Symptoms include shortness of breath, tightness of the chest, coughing, sputum production and wheezing. Some patients may also develop upper airway symptoms such as itchy eyes, tearing, sneezing, nasal congestion and rhinorrhea.

Symptoms may develop over many years as in sensitizer induced asthma or may occur after a single exposure to a high-concentration agent as in case of RADS.

Risk factors
At present, over 400 workplace substances have been identified as having asthmagenic or allergenic properties. Agents such as flour, diisocyanates, latex, persulfate salts, aldehydes, animals, wood dusts, metals, enzymes usually account for the majority cases, however, the distribution of causal agents may vary widely across geographic areas, depending on the pattern of industrial activities. For example, in France the industries most affected are bakeries and cake-shops, automobile industry and hairdressers, whereas in Canada the principal cause is wood dust, followed by isocyanates. Furthermore, the most common cause of occupational asthma in the workplace are isocyanates. Isocyanates are used in the production of motor vehicles and in the application of orthopaedic polyurethane and fibreglass casts.

The occupations most at risk are: adhesive handlers (e.g. acrylate), animal handlers and veterinarians (animal proteins), bakers and millers (cereal grains), carpet makers (gums), electronics workers (soldering resin), forest workers, carpenters and cabinetmakers (wood dust), hairdressers (e.g. persulfate), health care workers (latex and chemicals such as glutaraldehyde), janitors and cleaning staff (e.g. chloramine-T), pharmaceutical workers (drugs, enzymes), seafood processors, shellac handlers (e.g. amines), solderers and refiners (metals), spray painters, insulation installers, plastics and foam industry workers (e.g. diisocyanates), textile workers (dyes) and users of plastics and epoxy resins (e.g. anhydrides)

The following tables show occupations that are known to be at risk for occupational asthma, the main reference for these is the Canadian Centre for Occupational Health and Safety.

Diagnosis
To diagnose occupational asthma it is necessary to confirm the symptoms of asthma and establish the causal connection with the work environment.  Various diagnostic tests can be used to aid in diagnoses of work related asthma.

A spirometer is a device used to measure timed expired and inspired volumes, and can be used to help diagnose asthma.

Peak expiratory flow rate (PEFR) is a hand held device which measures  how fast a person can exhale and is a reliable test for occupational asthma. Serial PEFR can be measured to see if there is a difference in ability to exhale at work compared to that in a controlled environment.

A non-specific bronchial hyperreactivity test can be used to support the diagnose occupational asthma. It involves measuring the forced expiratory volume in 1 second (FEV-1) of the patient before and after exposure to methacholine or mannitol. Presence of airway responsiveness i.e. significant drop in FEV-1 can be seen in patients with occupational asthma.

Specific inhalation challenges test consist of exposing the subjects to the suspected occupational agent in the laboratory and/or at the workplace and assess for asthma symptoms as well as a reduction in FEV1.

Other tests such as skin prick test, serum immunologic testing and measurement of sputum eosinophils can also be useful in establishing the diagnosis of occupational asthma.

Prevention 
Several forms of preventive measures have been suggested to prevent development of occupational asthma and also detect risk or disease early to allow intervention and improve outcomes. These include: comprehensive programs, education and training, medical examinations, use of medications, reduction of exposures and elimination of exposures.

Asthma symptoms and airway hyperresponsiveness can persist for several years after removal from the offending environment. Thus, early restriction from exposure to the trigger is advisable. Completely stopping exposure is more effective treatment than reducing exposure, but not always feasible.

Management

Medication

Immunotherapy can also be used in some cases of sensitizer induced occupational asthma.

Epidemiology 
Occupational asthma is one of the most common occupational lung disease. Approximately 17% of all adult-onset asthma cases are related to occupational exposures. About one fourth of adults with asthma have work-exacerbated asthma. Patients with work-related asthma are more likely to experience asthma attacks, emergency room visits, and worsening of their asthma symptoms compared with other adult asthma patients.

Society and culture

Compensation 

When a person is diagnosed with occupational asthma, it can result in serious socio-economic consequences not only for the workers but also for the employer and the healthcare system because the worker must change positions. The probability of being re-employed is lower for those with occupational asthma compared to those with normal asthma. The employer not only pays compensation to the employee, but will also have to spend a considerable amount of time and energy and funds for hiring and training new personnel. In the United States, it was estimated that the direct cost of occupational asthma in 1996 was $1.2 billion and the indirect cost $0.4 billion, for a total cost of $1.6 billion. In most cases, the employer could have saved more money by adhering to safety standards rather than causing employees to become injured.

However, this can entail severe socio-economic consequences for the worker as well as the employer due to loss of job, unemployment, compensation issues, medical expenditures, and hiring and re-training of new personnel.

See also 
Chronic obstructive pulmonary disease (COPD)
Specific inhalation challenge
Occupational safety and health
National Institute of Occupational Safety and Health (NIOSH)
Labor rights

References

External links 

NIOSH: Prevention of Occupational Asthma
Occupational asthma and work aggravated asthma (UK)
https://www.cdc.gov/niosh/topics/asthma/default.html

Asthma
Asthma
Occupational safety and health